Pledis Entertainment is a South Korean entertainment company founded by Han Sung-Soo in 2007. The label is home to actress Nana, Hwang Min-hyun, Baekho, and K-pop groups Seventeen and Fromis 9. Its name originates from the pleiades, a star cluster in the constellation Taurus.

On May 25, 2020, Hybe Corporation, became its majority shareholder but still remains an independent label.

History

2007–2012: Founding and early artists
Pledis Entertainment was founded in 2007. Son Dam-bi was the first artist to debut under Pledis, and was dubbed the 'female Rain' by media outlets. In its beginning stages, the agency did not have management premises, only a practice room. In January 2009, Pledis debuted its first girl group, After School. A sub-unit of After School called Orange Caramel was formed in 2010, consisting of members Nana, Lizzy and Raina.

In December 2010, Pledis released Happy Pledis 1st Album, featuring After School, which included the tracks "Love Love Love" and "Someone Is You". Happy Pledis was a series of albums to be released annually, featuring Pledis artists, with proceeds going to charity. Proceeds from the first album were donated to Save the Children.

In July 2011, two further sub-units of After School were created, A.S. Red and A.S. Blue. Happy Pledis 2nd Album, featuring Son Dam-bi, After School, Pledis Boys, and Yoo Ara, was released in December, with proceeds going to UNICEF.

2012–2020: Joint ventures and development 
In March 2012, Pledis debuted their first boy band NU'EST. In May 2012, the agency joint ventures with Fantagio and debuted a six-member girl group, Hello Venus. In June 2012, Kahi "graduated" from After School and continued with her solo career under Pledis.

On November 11, 2013, Pledis Entertainment and Chinese agency Yuehua Entertainment held a press conference titled "Yuehua Entertainment X Pledis" at the Beijing Banquet Hall, marking the start of a collaboration under which the sub-unit NU'EST-M was formed with the addition of Chinese member Jason Fulong Fei, known as JA. The six-member team performed for the first time at the press event.

On July 21, 2014, the partnership between Pledis and Fantagio was dissolved. The two members under Pledis, Yoo Ara and Yoonjo, left Hello Venus while the four members under Fantagio continued as a group under the same name. In December 2014, Jooyeon graduated from After School after her contract expired. That month, Kahi announced to parted ways with the agency.

Thirteen-member boy group Seventeen debuted in May 2015, after training under the company for several years. In June 2015, Son Dam-bi parted ways with the agency after ten years.

In March 2016, Pledis formed a pre-debut team called "Pledis Girlz". Some of the pre-debut team members Nayoung, Roa, Yuha, Eunwoo, Rena, Kyulkyung and Xiyeon had competed in the survival show Produce 101 and concluded the show with two members, Nayoung and Kyulkyung, debuting in the survival project girl group I.O.I. Before their debut, Pledis Girlz held concerts which the members performed weekly from May 2016 until January 2017 and also released their pre-debut single titled "WE", with the exception of Nayoung and Kyulkyung, who were still promoting with I.O.I at the time. In January 2017, Pledis Girlz concluded their weekly concerts with the announcement of the official group name Pristin, following Nayoung and Kyulkyung wrapping up their activities with I.O.I in the same months. Pristin officially debuted as a ten-member girl group in March 2017.

On May 31, 2017, UEE graduated from After School after her contract expired.

In May 2018, Lizzy graduated from After School following the expiration of her contract but remains a member of Orange Caramel. In June 2018, it was confirmed that After School member Kaeun and Huh Yunjin, a Korean-American trainee, would participate in the survival show series Produce 48. At the end of the show, it was revealed that Kaeun placed 14th overall and Yunjin placed 26th. Both failed to make it into the final lineup of the winning group, Iz*One. Yunjin was later signed to Source Music and  debuted as an member of Le Sserafim in May 2022.

On May 24, 2019, Pristin was officially disbanded. Pledis announced that while Kyulkyung, Yehana, and Sungyeon would stay with the company, the remaining seven (Xiyeon, Rena, Roa, Kyla, Nayoung, Yuha, and Eunwoo) would be departing. After reuniting for the first time in almost two years, NU'EST announced their contract renewal with Pledis Entertainment. On July 6, 2019, Kaeun graduated from After School following the expiration of her contract. On December 20, 2019, Han Dong-geun parted ways with Pledis Entertainment. On December 27, 2019, Raina graduated from After School following the expiration of her contract.

On January 16, 2020, After School's E-Young announced that she has left Pledis Entertainment with the expiration of her contract.

2020–present: Hybe Labels, new headquarters and evolution 
On May 25, 2020, Hybe Corporation, formerly Big Hit Entertainment, officially announced the acquisition of a majority shareholder of Pledis Entertainment. It was also announced that Pledis Entertainment will receive financial and expertise support from Hybe Labels while still operating as an independent label. On October 18, 2020, Fair Trade Commission officially approved Hybe Corp.’s acquisition of Pledis Entertainment.

On March 22, 2021, Pledis Entertainment, as well as the other labels part of Hybe Labels, moved to its new headquarters in the Yongsan Trade Center, the new headquarters of Hybe Corporation. On March 31, 2021, the official website of Pledis Entertainment in its Company section changed its physical address to the new building in Yongsan, Seoul. On July 19, 2021, all 13 members of Seventeen renewed their contracts with Pledis Entertainment. On August 16, 2021, it was announced that the girl group fromis 9 would be managed by Pledis Entertainment and they would be leaving Off The Record after the release of their single album 9 Way Ticket in May 2021 as the agency would be taking over all management of the group following their transfer to the agency. In December 2021, Nana has re-signed her contract with Pledis Entertainment. This is her third contract renewal with the agency within 12 years since her debut in 2009.

On February 28, 2022, it was announced that NU'EST's exclusive contract with Pledis Entertainment will end on March 14, 2022. It was also announced that members Aron, JR and Ren will leave the agency at the conclusion of their contract, while Baekho and Minhyun opted to renew. With the news of their contract expiring, the NU'EST members confirmed the group's disbandment through handwritten letters to their fans, announcing their decision to go their own separate ways. On July 28, 2022, Pledis Entertainment announced that member Jang Gyu-ri would be leaving fromis 9 on July 31. The company explained in their statement that when the group transferred to Pledis, every member signed a new exclusive artist contract with the company, however, Gyuri chose not to. After lengthy discussion about what is the best direction for each other, Gyuri chose not to sign a contract and embark on a new journey.

Artists
All artists under Pledis Entertainment are collectively known as Happy Pledis.

Active artists
Groups
 After School
 Seventeen
 Fromis 9
Subunits
 Orange Caramel
 BSS (BooSeokSoon)
Soloists
 Bumzu 
 Baekho
 Hwang Min-hyun
 Yehana 
 Sungyeon
Producers
 Bumzu
 Baekho
 Woozi
 Shannon (Sungyeon)
Source:

Actors
 Nana
 Baekho (Kang Dong Ho)
 Hwang Min-hyun

Source:

Former artists

After School (2009-2015)
Soyoung (2009)
 Bekah (2009–2011)
 Jooyeon (2009–2014)
 Kahi (2009–2015)
 Jungah (2009–2016)
 Uee (2009–2017)
 Lizzy (2010–2018)
 Kaeun (2012–2019)
 Raina (2009–2019)
E-Young (2011–2020)
Hello Venus (2012–2014, joint ventures with Fantagio 'Tricell Media')
 Ara (2011–2014)
 Yoonjo (2012–2014)
 Son Dam-bi (2007–2015)
NU'EST (2012–2022)
 NU'EST-M (2013–2014)
Jason (2013–2014)
 NU'EST W (2017–2018)
JR (2012–2022)
Aron (2012–2022)
Ren (2012–2022)
 Pristin (2016–2019)
 Pristin V (2018–2019)
 Nayoung (2016–2019)
 Roa (2016–2019)
 Eunwoo (2016–2019)
 Rena (2016–2019)
 Kyulkyung (2016–2019)
 Yuha (2016–2019)
 Xiyeon (2016–2019)
 Kyla (2016–2019)
Han Dong-geun (2013–2019)
Fromis 9 
 Jang Gyu-ri (2021–2022)

Discography 

Happy Pledis discography 
 Happy Pledis 1st Album – "Love Love Love" (2010)
 Happy Pledis 2nd Album – "Love Letter" (2011)
 Happy Pledis Digital Single – "Dashing Through The Snow with High Heels" (2012)

References

External links
 

 
South Korean record labels
Talent agencies of South Korea
Music companies of South Korea
Entertainment companies established in 2007
Publishing companies established in 2007
South Korean companies established in 2007
Companies based in Seoul
Gangnam District
Hybe Corporation